This is a list of the members of the Lower Saxon Landtag in the period 2008 to 2013. This is the sixteenth period. The members were elected in the election of 27 January 2008.

Overview

A total of 152 representatives were elected, distributed as follows:
10 to The Left (Die Linke)
48 to the Social Democratic Party (Sozialdemokratische Partei Deutschlands)
12 to the Alliance '90/The Greens (Bündnis 90/Die Grünen)
68 to the Christian Democratic Union (Christlich Demokratische Union Deutschlands)
13 to the Free Democratic Party (Freie Demokratische Partei)
1 independent

Out of these representatives, the second cabinet Wulff was formed.

List of representatives

References

Lower Saxon Landtag official site